

England

A 
Albion Fairs
Aldeburgh Festival, Suffolk
Appleby Jazz Festival
Arundel Festival

B 
Barnes Film Festival
Bath Fringe Festival
Bath International Music Festival
Bath Literature Festival
Beached Festival in Scarborough
Bedford River Festival
Big Chill Festival in Eastnor
Birmingham: ArtsFest, Book Festival, International Carnival, Birmingham International Dance Festival (BIDF), Birmingham Mela 
Blackpool: Illuminations, Festival of Light, Rebellion Festival
Blissfields, near Winchester
Bloodstock Open Air
Boishakhi Mela festival
Bradford Literature Festival
Bradford Mela Festival
Bridgnorth Folk Festival, Shropshire
Bridgwater: Guy Fawkes Carnival
Brighton Festival
Brighton Festival Fringe
Bristol: Ashton Court, Bristol International Balloon Fiesta, Harbour Festival
Bromyard Folk Festival
Bulldog Bash Motorcycle Festival
BunkFest
Burtfest, Burton Upon Trent
Bury Festival, Bury St Edmunds, Suffolk
Buxton Festival, Buxton, Derbyshire

C 
Cambridge Folk Festival
CarFest
Cary Comes Home Festival
Castlemorton Common Festival
Cheltenham: Cheltenham Festivals:
 Cheltenham Cricket Festival
 Cheltenham Jazz Festival
 Cheltenham Literature Festival
 Cheltenham Music Festival
 Cheltenham Science Festival
Chicken Stock Festival, small arts festival near Malvern, Worcestershire
Cleveland: Middlesbrough Music Live Stockton Riverside Festival
Clitheroe Food Festival, Lancashire's premier food and drink festival, Clitheroe, Lancashire
Coventry: Godiva, Jazz, Town & Country, Kite, Royal Show
Creamfields dance music festival
Cropredy Festival
Cypriot Film Festival UK

D 
Deepdale Festival, Deepdale Backpackers & Camping, Burnham Deepdale, Norfolk
Deepdale Hygge, Deepdale Backpackers & Camping, Burnham Deepdale, Norfolk
Donington Monsters of Rock
Dover Carnival, Dover, England
Download Festival, annual rock festival held at Donington Park motorsport circuit since 2003
Durham Miners' Gala

E 
Endless Festival
Esedhvos Kernow, Cornwall

F 
Frome Festival, Somerset
FuseLeeds

G 
Glastonbury Festival
Glyndebourne Opera Festival
Godiva Festival
Golowan Festival
Great British Rhythm and Blues Festival, Colne, Lancashire
Greenbelt festival
Greenwich+Docklands International Festival
Guilfest

H 
H2OFest
Harrogate: Harrogate International Festivals, Great Yorkshire Show
Hemsby Festival
Henley Festival of Music and the Arts
HowTheLightGetsIn Festival
Huddersfield: Caribbean Carnival, Huddersfield Contemporary Music Festival, Asian Mela

I 
Ilkley Literature Festival
International Festival of the Sea
International Guitar Festival of Great Britain, Wirral
International Organ Festival at St Albans
Isle of Wight Festival 1968, 1969 and 1970

J

K 
Keighley: Keighley Festival
Kendal Mountain Film Festival
Keswick Mountain Festival
Knebworth concerts (occasional)

L 
Land of Kings, London Borough of Hackney
The Lakes International Comic Art Festival, Kendal, Cumbria
Latitude Festival, Suffolk
Ledbury Poetry Festival, Herefordshire
LeeFest, Bromley
Leicester: Leicester Comedy Festival, Leicester Caribbean Carnival
Letchworth Garden City: Rap-Aid Music Festival
Lichfield Festival
Liverpool: Liverpool Garden Festival (1984)
London: Carnival de Cuba; Carnaval Del Pueblo, Europe's biggest Latin American festival; City of London Festival; Covent Garden Festival; Kensington Dollshouse Festival; Festival of Britain (1951); Greenwich+Docklands International Festival; Greenwich Film Festival; Lesbian and Gay Film Festival; Notting Hill Carnival; Oktoberfest, the German cultural festival held in Richmond-upon-Thames; Portobello Film Festival; Spitalfields Festival
London History Festival
Ludlow Festival, Shropshire
Lumiere festival
Luton Carnival
Lyme Regis Fossil Festival
Lytham Festival, Lytham St Anne's, Lancashire

N 
Newcastle upon Tyne: The Hoppings
Newlyn Fish Festival
Norfolk and Norwich Festival
Nouka Baich

O

P 
Peak Literary Festival, Peak District National Park
Pershore Plum Festival, Pershore, Worcestershire
Peterborough Festival
Parklife Weekender, Heaton Park

R 
Reading: Reading Festival, WOMAD
RhythmTree World Music & Didgeridoo Festival, Calbourne Water Mill, Calbourne, Isle of Wight
Ross on Wye International Festival

S 
Salisbury International Arts Festival
Sathiyanathan Natarajan
Scarborough Literature Festival
Shakespeare Schools Festival
Sheffield International Documentary Festival
Shifnal Festival
Sidmouth International Festival
Slapstick Festival
Soundwave Festival
St Barnabas Community Fete, Bow, London
Stonehenge Free Festival
Strawberry Fair, Cambridge
Swan Upping

T 
Thames Festival
Thought Bubble Festival
Three Choirs Festival
The Tolpuddle Martyrs festival
Towersey Village Festival
Tramlines Festival

U

V 
V Festival
Vegfest (UK)

W 
Warwick Folk Festival
West Country: West Country Carnival circuit
Weyfest
Wimborne Folk Festival
Wirral International Film Festival
Womad
Women in Tune
Wonderfields, Devon
Worcestershire Literary Festival

Y 
Young Carer's Festival, Curdridge, Southampton

Z

Scotland
Aberdeen: Aberdeen International Youth Festival, The World Festival of Youth Arts; Word; Wordfringe; Dance Live; Sound
Dumfries and Galloway: Gaelfest
Dundee: Dundee Flower and Food Festival, Dundee Guitar Festival, Dundee Blues Bonanza, Dundee International Book Prize
Edinburgh: Edinburgh Festival, Edinburgh International Festival, Edinburgh Art Festival, Edinburgh International Science Festival, Edinburgh Festival Fringe, Edinburgh International Book Festival, Edinburgh Military Tattoo, International Festivals of the Sea
Glamis, by Forfar: Scotland's Countryside Festival
Glasgow: Glasgow Jazz Festival; Celtic Connections; MovieMinds, an international online film festival TRNSMT
Hebridean Celtic Festival
Inverary: Connect Festival
Inverness: Highland Festival
Orkney: St Magnus Festival
Perth & Kinross: Mugstock Festival
Shakespeare Schools Festival, various locations
Shetland: Up Helly-Aa
Ullapool: Loopallu Festival
Various sites: T in the Park

Wales
Abergavenny Food Festival
Brecon Jazz Festival
Cardiff Festival
Cardiff International Film Festival Wales
Green Man Festival
Hay Festival of Literature & Arts
HowTheLightGetsIn Festival, Hay-on-Wye
Llangollen International Eisteddfod
National Eisteddfod of Wales
Pontardawe Festival
Shakespeare Schools Festival, various locations
Small Nations Festival
Urdd National Eisteddfod

Northern Ireland
Belfast Festival at Queens
Belfast Film Festival
Shakespeare Schools Festival, Belfast and Derry

Themes
Film: Birmingham, Cardiff, Edinburgh, Greenwich, Lesbian and Gay, Portobello, Sheffield
Folk: Bridgnorth, Bromyard, Cambridge, Cropredy, Fleetwood, Sidmouth, Towersey, Warwick, Wimborne
Jazz: Bath, Birmingham, Burnham Deepdale, Coventry, Glasgow, Clitheroe
Literature: Bath, Birmingham, Cheltenham, Hay, Ilkley, Worcestershire Literary Festival, Wordfringe
Other: Bristol Harbour Festival (maritime), HowTheLightGetsIn (philosophy and music)

See also
List of music festivals in the United Kingdom
List of festivals
Literary festival#Europe
Free festival

References